Creepshow is a 1982 American comedy horror anthology film.

Creepshow may also refer to:

Film and television
 Creepshow 2, a 1987 American comedy horror anthology film
 Creepshow 3, a 2006 American horror film, and a sequel to the horror anthology classics Creepshow and Creepshow 2
 Creepshow (TV series), a 2019 horror anthology web television series

Music
 The Creepshow, a band from Burlington, Ontario, Canada
 Creepshow, an album by Xiu Xiu and Grouper
 Creepshow (soundtrack), 1982 soundtrack album for the film
 Creepshow 2 (soundtrack), 1987 soundtrack album for the film
 "Creepshow", a single by Kerli from the album Love Is Dead
 "Creepshow", a song by Skid Row from the album Slave to the Grind

Other uses
 Creepshow (comics), a graphic novella based on the film of the same name

See also
 Creep (disambiguation)
 Freakshow (disambiguation)